kamrankashmiri
This is a list of aircraft in alphabetical order beginning with 'S'.

Sd

SDB
(SDB, an enterprise of the Moscow State Technical University of Civil Aviation, Moscow, Russia)
SDB Karat
SDB Poisk

SD Planes 
 SD-1 Mini-Sport

References

Further reading

External links

 List Of Aircraft (S)

de:Liste von Flugzeugtypen/N–S
fr:Liste des aéronefs (N-S)
nl:Lijst van vliegtuigtypes (N-S)
pt:Anexo:Lista de aviões (N-S)
ru:Список самолётов (N-S)
sv:Lista över flygplan/N-S
vi:Danh sách máy bay (N-S)